The Kanabec County Courthouse, located at 18 Vine Street North in Mora, Kanabec County in the U.S. state of Minnesota is a beige brick, Romanesque building, featuring a prominent 4-story center tower. The courthouse sits on a stone foundation. Arched windows and doorways with brown sandstone sills lend distinction.  The eaves were built with unusual corbelled brick and the corners of the tower are decorated with tourelles. Hardwood floors and oak balusters lead to the second-floor courtrooms. Charles Skoglund built the building in 1894 for $7,200.

It was designed by architects Buechner and Jacobson.

References

Buildings and structures in Kanabec County, Minnesota
County courthouses in Minnesota
Courthouses on the National Register of Historic Places in Minnesota
Government buildings completed in 1894
Romanesque Revival architecture in Minnesota
National Register of Historic Places in Kanabec County, Minnesota
1894 establishments in Minnesota